Malikpur (a.k.a Malikpur Chahra) is a village in Gujrat District, Punjab, Pakistan. It is surrounded on the East by Jora and Jalalpur, and on the West by Chahra and Tibba Bootay Shah. A unique feature of Malikpur is that it is surrounded by water-drainage canals called naalas or choyees on both the East and the West ends of the village that come together to form the Dhamel at the South end of the village. Historically, Malikpur has been divided into two main parts: Eastern Muhalla (Charday ala Muhalla) and Western Muhalla (Lehnday ala Muhalla).

The majority of the people of Malikpur are Gujjars, but people from other clans such as Syeds and Butts also reside here. There is also a significant population of people from the worker/skilled class (eg Mochi, Kumhaar, Taili…etc) that are spread throughout the village. Historically, there have been three main families within the Gujjar clan in Malikpur: Dheendhas, Khatanas & Chaudhrys. Overtime, the demographics of the village have changed dramatically with many people moving to cities and/or overseas in pursuit of employment or a better life. Several clans of Malikpur have well-educated and respected personalities but the Dheendhas are considered as one of the most educated and respected clans not only in Malikpur, but also within the surrounding regions. Traditionally, men from this clan joined the Pakistan Armed Forces where they made significant contributions. However more recently, a larger chunk of the clan have relocated to larger cities like Gujrat or have moved abroad to other countries where they have excelled in the fields of Medicine, IT, Real estate, Education, Business, Law, Accounting & Finance (just to name a few). Several members of the clan still reside in Gujrat and are actively involved in social work not only within Malikpur, but also in the surrounding villages.

Malikpur has traditionally fallen under the Union Council (UC) of Deona, but over time, it has switched from either UC Deona or UC Sabowal. Prior to 1996, Malikpur was part of UC Deona, but after 1996 it switched to UC Sabowal. Similarly, in 1999 it became part of UC Deona but in the 2015 local government elections, it was again made part of UC Sabowal.
Villages in Gujrat District